Lower Wraxall may refer to three places in England:
Lower Wraxall, Dorset
Lower Wraxall, Somerset
Lower Wraxall, Wiltshire